Panos Demetrios Bardis (1924–1996) was a Greek American sociologist specializing in study of the family across cultures. He was professor of sociology at the University of Toledo.

Works

Monographs 

 The family in changing civilizations (1969)
 Encyclopedia of campus unrest (1971)
 Studies in marriage and the family (1975)
 The future of the Greek language in the United States (1976)
 The family in Asia (1979) [coauthor Man Singh Das]
 History of thanatology: philosophical, religious, psychological, and sociological ideas concerning death, from primitive times to the present (1981)
 Dictionary of quotations in sociology (1985)
 Marriage and family: continuity, change, and adjustment (1988)
 South Africa and the Marxist movement: a study in double standards (1989)

Articles 

 "Synopsis and Evaluation of Theories Concerning Family Evolution", Social Science 38 (1963): 42–52.

Reviews 

 W. K. Lacey, The Family in Classical Greece (1968). Reviewed for Journal of Marriage and the Family 34 (1972): 180–181.
"Silent Dr. X" / Panos Bardis. "EI" Magazine of European Art Center (EUARCE) 6st issue  1994 p. 13&24-25
Panos Bardis died. "Apodemon Epos" Magazine of European Art Center (EUARCE) of Greece, 3st issue 1997 p.4 https://docs.wixstatic.com/ugd/bbb0cf_a70a7dadf1f844cab45b9708dea20fcf.pdf       
Panos Bardis. The more fascinated I am, the more I believe(A')."Apodemon Epos" Magazine of European Art Center (EUARCE) of Greece, 5st issue 1998 p.1-5 https://docs.wixstatic.com/ugd/bbb0cf_154eb57bcb214901b001eb7ec1db0634.pdf             
Panos Bardis. The more fascinated I am, the more I believe(B')."Apodemon Epos" Magazine of European Art Center (EUARCE) of Greece, 6st issue 1998 p.1-3 https://docs.wixstatic.com/ugd/bbb0cf_f3fad7ebc5e24ddf973a40e15b54074e.pdf

1924 births
1996 deaths
American sociologists
American people of Greek descent